Moulyinning is a small town located in the Shire of Dumbleyung,  west of Kukerin.
Most members of the population live outside the town-site, living and working on farms managing live stock and producing wheat and other cereal crops. The primary features of the townsite include the Town Hall, primary school and a surge receival site for Cooperative Bulk Handling alongside the railway line.

References

External links
History of Moulyinning